Aare is an Estonian surname meaning "treasure". Notable people with the surname include:
 Juhan Aare (1948–2021), Estonian journalist and politician
 Toivo Aare (1944–1999), Estonian journalist
 Tõnu Aare (1953–2021), Estonian singer and guitarist (of the band "Apelsin")

Estonian-language surnames